Christine Moore (born October 21, 1983) is a Canadian politician and nurse who served as the Member of Parliament (MP) for the riding of Abitibi—Témiscamingue from 2011 to 2019. A member of the New Democratic Party (NDP), she was first elected in the 2011 Canadian federal election, defeating Bloc Québécois MP Marc Lemay, who had held the riding since 2004. She was re-elected during the 2015 federal election. She did not run for re-election in the 2019 federal election. Despite her Anglophone-sounding name, Moore is a Francophone.

Early life
Moore was born in La Reine, Quebec.

Education and experience 
Moore was trained as a medical technician; she was educated at 52e Medical coy (Army Force) Sherbrooke and graduated in 2005.  She earned a diploma of college studies in nursing from the Cégep de l'Abitibi-Témiscamingue in 2008 and a B.Sc. in nursing from the Université du Québec en Abitibi-Témiscamingue (UQAT) in 2010. She completed a one-month humanitarian internship in Senegal as part of her nursing degree at UQAT in 2009, and she served with the Canadian Forces for over three years. She is also a member of Nurses Without Borders.

Political career

Federal politics 
Moore finished a distant fourth as the NDP candidate in Abitibi—Témiscamingue in 2006 and 2008; both times, she came up well short of the 10-percent threshold to have her campaign expenses refunded.  However, on her third try in 2011, she defeated Lemay by 9,500 votes as part of the NDP wave that swept through Quebec.

On May 26, 2011, Moore was appointed the federal Official Opposition critic for military procurement. The key files Moore was responsible for included the purchase of F 35s, the modernization of various navy ships, and the replacement of search and rescue aircraft. Consequently, she worked mostly on the Standing Committee on National Defence, the main forum for addressing these issues. She also assisted Jack Harris with his duties as federal Official Opposition critic for National Defence.

In November 2013, Moore was appointed deputy critic for energy and natural resources for the NDP. The key files covered by this responsibility: forestry, mines, nuclear & pipelines. In 2014, Moore brought forward a motion to promote a national strategy on forestry in Canada. This motion asked that the government should work in consultation with provinces and territories, First Nations, stakeholders, and the public to put forward, a national strategy to advance Canada's forestry sector, with the objectives of creating value-added jobs, developing our forests in a sustainable way, diversifying and promoting wood-based products and developing building systems, and by expanding international markets for Canadian wood products.

During the 2011–2012 New Democratic Party leadership race, Moore endorsed Romeo Saganash.

In January 2015, Moore was appointed deputy critic for health for the NDP. She was reelected at the federal election held a few months later, with a somewhat reduced plurality.

In February 2016, Moore was elected to the executive committee of the Commonwealth Parliamentary Association as a vice-chair. She also served as vice-chair of the Canadian Association of Parliamentarians on Population and Development.

Moore gave birth during the election campaign in 2015. She had been pushing for more resources for MPs with newborns since she came back to Parliament in fall in 2015: high chairs were put in parliamentary cafeteria, the Commons Board of Internal Economy also changed the name of the "spouses lounge" near the Commons Chamber to "family room" to better accommodate the changing demographics of the House.

On March 24, 2016, Moore introduced the bill that would eliminate the federal tax on certain baby products.

Sexual misconduct allegations 

In 2018 it was revealed that Moore, as an unnamed MP, had accused  former Liberal MPs Massimo Pacetti and Scott Andrews of sexual harassment in 2014. Both Andrews and Pacetti, who maintained their innocence, were suspended from caucus and sat as independent MPs pending investigation of the complaints. After the investigation, both MPs were permanently expelled from the Liberal caucus and were barred from running as Liberals in the 2015 election.

On May 8, 2018, CBC News reported that Moore had had a non-consensual sexual encounter with a disabled Canadian Forces member, Glen Kirkland, who had come to Parliament Hill in 2013 to testify about military treatment of injured soldiers and veterans. Kirkland, describing the encounter, stated "there was a definite power imbalance and she had a position of authority and I just find it exceptionally ironic that she put herself in this moral, or ethical authority situation now with Erin Weir." She was subsequently suspended from the NDP caucus on May 8, 2018 for allegedly behaving inappropriately while the party ordered an investigation.

On May 13, 2018, Moore held a press conference denying the accusations, stating that she had a romantic relationship with Kirkland that lasted about four months between June and October 2013. She provided photo evidence and email copies of travel itineraries in an effort to prove the relation was consensual.

On July 19, 2018, party leader Jagmeet Singh publicly announced the results of an investigation into his MP's behaviour exonerating her from the allegations and reinstating her to her previous caucus duties.

On June 7, 2019 Moore announced she would not be seeking re-election in the 2019 federal election.

Provincial politics 

Moore ran as a Parti Québecois candidate in the 2022 Quebec Provincial election. in Ungava.

Electoral record

Abitibi—Témiscamingue

|align="left" colspan=2|New Democratic Party gain from Bloc Québécois
|align="right"|Swing
|align="right"| +29.0
|align="right"|

|-

References

External links
Official website

Christine Moore - Open Parliament

1983 births
Living people
New Democratic Party MPs
Women members of the House of Commons of Canada
Members of the House of Commons of Canada from Quebec
Université du Québec en Abitibi-Témiscamingue alumni
Women in Quebec politics
French Quebecers
Canadian female military personnel
21st-century Canadian politicians
21st-century Canadian women politicians
Canadian nurses
Canadian women nurses